Harmony School may refer to:

 One of the Harmony Public Schools in Texas
 Harmony School (Indiana) in Bloomington
 Harmony School, School District No. 53 in Otoe County, Nebraska, near Nebraska City

See also
 Harmony (disambiguation)
 Harmony Heights School
 Harmony Independent School District
 Harmony Middle School
 Harmony Union School District